The Disk Masher System (.dms) is an often used method on the Amiga, to create a compressed image of a disk (usually floppy). The disk is read block-by-block, and thus its data structure is maintained. DMS won approval particularly in the demo scene and the Warez scene, since with this tool, disk images could generally be transferred easily with telecommunication modems to mailbox networks like FidoNet for efficient distribution.

The DiskMasher format is copyright-protected and has problems storing particular bit sequences due to bugs in the compression algorithm, but was widely used in the pirate and demo scenes.  To avoid these issues, a number of other disk compressors were developed that used alternative disk reading and compression methods, for instance, xDM or XAD (software).

References

External links
xDMS - Tool for AmigaOS, MS-DOS  and  Linux for decompressing DMS files.

Archive formats